Through Low Light and Trees is the debut studio album by English duo Smoke Fairies. It was released in September 2010 on V2 Records and later worldwide via Year Seven Records.

Track list

Personnel
All personnel credits adapted from Through Low Light and Trees album notes.

 Viola – Neil Walsh
 Bass – Kristofer Harris
 Drums – Martin Dean
 Recorder - Jenny Blamire
 Vocals, Guitar – Jessica Davies
 Vocals, Guitar, Organ, Piano – Katherine Blamire
 Producer, Recorded By, Mixed By – Head
 Written-By – Smoke Fairies

References

2011 albums
Smoke Fairies albums
V2 Records albums